Distance is a numerical description of how far apart objects are.

Distance may also refer to:

Science and math
 Distance function, defines a distance between each pair of elements of a set
 Distance (graph theory), the distance between two vertices in a graph
 Cosmic distance ladder, the succession of methods by which astronomers determine the distances to celestial objects
 Social distance, a sociological concept relating to personal space and proxemics
An obsolete unit of measure; see List of unusual units of measurement

Music
Distance (band), a late-1980s rock supergroup featuring Bernard Edwards and Tony Thompson
Distance (musician), British music producer and DJ, influential on the dubstep genre

Albums
Distance (Antagonist EP), 2007
Distance (Battery album), 1996
Distance (Dan Michaelson and The Coastguards album), 2014
Distance (Hikaru Utada album), 2001

Songs
"Distance" (SS501 song), 2007
"Distance" (F.T. Island song), 2011
"Distance" (Christina Perri song), 2012
"Distance", by All Saints from Saints & Sinners, 2000
"Distance", by OneRepublic from Human, 2020
"Distance", by Rudimental from Ground Control, 2021

Other
Distance (2001 film), a Japanese film directed by Hirokazu Koreeda
Distance (2002 film), an American short film directed by Jonathan Jakubowicz
Distance (2015 film), a Chinese film
Distances (film), a 2018 Spanish film
Distance (Doctor Who), a Doctor Who short story

See also
The Distance (disambiguation)